Bato, Bato is the third studio album by Yugoslav pop-folk singer Lepa Brena and her band Slatki Greh. It was released 5 January 1984 through the record label PGP-RTB and with over a million copies sold it is one of the best-selling albums in the history of Yugoslavia and made Lepa Brena a superstar outside of her home-country, especially in Bulgaria and Romania.

This was her fourth of twelve albums with Slatki Greh.

Background 
This album marked the end of cooperation with their former manager, Milutin Popović Zachar, and the beginning of the golden career period of Lepa Brena, with new manager Raka Đokić. Lepa Brena, for the promotion of the new album, was once again trained in acting, along with Nikola Simić, in the film Nema problema. The film and the new album "Bato, Bato" have been incredible success. The film, like a most watched, won the Oscars of Popularity that year. The album was sold in 1,100,000 copies, and thus became the best-selling album ever in the history of Yugoslavia. At the signing of the album in Belgrade, over 5,000 people came, and this caused huge crowds and traffic jam. Thanks to this album, Brena came to the top of the most popular singers in Yugoslavia, becoming a mega star in Romania and Bulgaria. In Timișoara, Romania, on August 10, 1985, 65,000 people performed at the Stadionul Dan Păltinișanu.

Title
The album name comes from a male nickname, Bato, very common in former Yugoslavia. Although there is also an English version of this name (also Bato), which means 'son of the farmer'. It is a form of the name Bartholomew.

Track listing

Release history

References

1984 albums
Lepa Brena albums
PGP-RTB albums
Serbo-Croatian language albums